Justín Javorek (14 September 1936 – 15 September 2021) was a Slovak football coach and goalkeeper for the Czechoslovakia national team.

Javorek had a brief stint managing Turkish side Altay S.K. in 1991.

References

External links
Manager profile at Mackolik.com

1936 births
2021 deaths
People from Trnava District
Sportspeople from the Trnava Region
Slovak footballers
Czechoslovak footballers
Association football goalkeepers
Czechoslovakia international footballers
Olympic footballers of Czechoslovakia
1960 European Nations' Cup players
1. FC Tatran Prešov players
FK Inter Bratislava players
Mersin İdman Yurdu footballers
Slovak football managers
Altay S.K. managers
FK Inter Bratislava managers
Czechoslovak football managers
FC Spartak Trnava managers
1. FC Tatran Prešov managers
Czechoslovak expatriate footballers
Czechoslovak expatriate sportspeople in Turkey
Expatriate footballers in Turkey
Slovak expatriate sportspeople in Turkey
Expatriate football managers in Turkey